NVTC may refer to: 

National Virtual Translation Center, a federal government agency of the United States.
Northern Virginia Transportation Commission, United States.
Northport Vehicle Terminal Centre, seaport of Northport, Malaysia.